Omar Yahya (Arabic:عمر يحيى) (born 20 June 1992) is a Qatari footballer. He currently plays for Umm Salal.

External links

References

Qatari footballers
1992 births
Living people
Al Sadd SC players
Umm Salal SC players
Qatar Stars League players
Association football fullbacks